Prague International Jazz Festival is a traditional jazz festival held annually in Reduta Jazz Club, in Prague, Czech Republic. In 2014 the festival celebrates its anniversary - 50 years from its establishment in 1964. Prague's festival belongs to the most traditional jazz festivals.

History of festival
The festival is the oldest music festival in the Czech Republic and also one of the oldest and most traditional ones in Europe. Prague International Jazz Festival became a tradition for Autumn as an equivalent to the Prague Spring International Music Festival of classical music, which is traditional for the first part of the year. During the previous years have the oragenizers focused more on the traditional jazz, but more recently they have been aiming for the variety in this music genre.

Legends of festival
During the past volumes of the festival the audience could have seen jazz legends such as Mr. Acker Bilk & his Bristol Paramount Jazz Band (1964 & 1982), Duke Ellington Orchestra (1968), Count Basie Orchestra & Oscar Peterson & Big Joe Turner (1974), Benny Goodman (1976), Didier Lockwood (1984), Stéphane Grappelli (1988), B.B. King (1990), Chick Corea Elektric Band (1991), Dave Brubeck Quartet (1996), Tony Bennett & Ralph Sharon Trio (1997), New York Voices (1998), Mal Waldron and Albert Mangelsdorff (2001), Rhoda Scott (2006), Boris Kozlov (2013).

See also
 Designblok

References

External links
Prague International Jazz Festival Official Site

Jazz festivals in the Czech Republic
Music in Prague
Recurring events established in 1964
Festivals in Prague
Music festivals established in 1964